Hypotrix basistriga is a moth of the family Noctuidae. It is known only from the White Mountains and Pinaleño Mountains in eastern Arizona.

The habitat consists of open ponderosa pine forests.

The length of the forewings is 12–13 mm. Adults are on wing from mid-June to late July.

Etymology
Basistriga is Latin and refers to the black dash or streak at the base of the forewing.

External links
A revision of the genus Hypotrix Guenée in North America with descriptions of four new species and a new genus (Lepidoptera, Noctuidae, Noctuinae, Eriopygini)
mothphotographersgroup

Hypotrix
Endemic fauna of Arizona
Moths of North America
~
~
Moths described in 2010